The 1928 Campeonato de Portugal Final was the final match of the 1927–28 Campeonato de Portugal, the 7th season of the Campeonato de Portugal, the Portuguese football knockout tournament, organized by the Portuguese Football Federation (FPF). The match was played on 30 June 1928 at the Campo de Palhavã in Lisbon, and opposed Carcavelinhos and Sporting CP. Carcavelinhos defeated Sporting CP 3–1 to claim their first Campeonato de Portugal.

Match

Details

References

1928
Final
Sporting CP matches
Atlético Clube de Portugal matches